ABC North West Queensland is an ABC Local Radio station based in Mount Isa.  The station broadcasts to the North West region of Queensland, which includes the towns of Cloncurry, Julia Creek, Hughenden and Normanton.

The station began broadcasting as 4MI in 1986 on 1080 AM.  Now there are a number of low power FM transmitters as well as these main transmitters:

4ISA 106.5 FM
4JK 567 AM
4HU 1485 AM

See also
 List of radio stations in Australia

References

North West Queensland
Radio stations in Queensland
North West Queensland